Ionuț Eugen Năstăsie (born 7 January 1992) is a Romanian footballer who plays as a midfielder for FC Hermannstadt.

Club career

Steaua București
He made his first team debut on 22 September 2011 against Sănătatea Cluj, coming on as a substitute.

Viitorul Constanța
In July 2013, he was transferred to Viitorul Constanța. He was released from Viitorul in September 2014.

International career

He played for Romania U-19 in the UEFA European Under-19 Football Championship group stage.

On 31 July 2011 at the age of 19 he was called up for Romania senior team.

Club statistics
(Correct as of 24 November 2020)

Honours

References

External links

1992 births
Living people
People from Dolj County
Association football midfielders
Romanian footballers
Romania youth international footballers
Romania under-21 international footballers
Liga I players
Liga II players
FC Steaua București players
FC Viitorul Constanța players
FC Argeș Pitești players
FC Hermannstadt players